The  is the national premier sports event of Japan. It consists of three stages. The skating and ice hockey stage takes place in January, the skiing stage takes place in February, and the main Autumn tournament takes place in September and October. Its name is often abbreviated to Kokutai (国体).

Outline 

The predecessor to the tournament was the Meiji Shrine tournament held from 1924 until 1943, a period including the Pacific War. Since then there was a Summer tournament that focused on swimming, and an Autumn tournament that focused on track-and-field; however from the 61st tournament in 2006, the Summer and Autumn tournaments were combined. On 20 December 2006 the Japan Sports Association, as the committee for the tournament, decided that swimming was to be held before mid-September as of and beyond the 64th tournament in 2009, though this actually came into effect in the 63rd tournament, in 2008. This took into account the peculiar qualities of holding swimming events. Also the golf tournament was moved forward in the schedule.

The previous Summer and Autumn tournaments have fundamentally been held across one prefecture. The two winter tournaments also take place in the same prefecture, making up the entire tournament. It is often the case when a tournament is held in colder areas such as Hokkaido, Tōhoku, Kōshin'etsu and Hokuriku, that both autumn and tournaments are held in the same prefecture. It is very rare that the skating and ice hockey tournaments are held in separate areas. From the 56th tournament in 2001, the National Sports Festival for People with Disabilities was also held.

At the skating and ice hockey tournaments includes figure skating, speed skating, short track speed skating, and ice hockey.
The skiing tournament includes giant slalom, ski jump, Nordic combined, cross-country skiing, and mogul skiing.
The autumn tournament consists of swimming, water polo, bowling, football, track and field, judo, kendo, fencing, wrestling, mountaineering, volleyball, basketball, softball (adults), baseball (high school - hardball and softball). When the summer and autumn tournaments were held separately, swimming, water polo, bowling and football were held in the summer season.
In addition, from the 43rd tournament in 1988 an exhibition sports event (known as ) was also held. It is an event for people to represent the prefectures they live, work or study in, and involves various active community sports.

During the tournament, the official rankings change in accordance with the number of points earned with the final result being the sum of all four tournaments. The top placing prefecture for both men and women is awarded the Emperor's Cup. The top prefecture for just the women's score is awarded the Empress's Cup.

At first, the summer and autumn tournaments were planned to always be held in Kansai, but after the first tournament in 1946, Ishikawa prefecture were presented the opportunity to host the second tournament. The host prefecture was then rotated throughout Japan.

Entry Qualifications and Age Classifications 
Entry qualifications differ depending on event, but as a general rule participants must be older than (or in) the third year of junior high school. Third year junior high schoolers have been allowed to participate since the 43rd tournament in 1988.
Age classification also differs depending on event but here are the general rules for swimming and track and field events. Other events follow similar guidelines.
Youth B: Born between 2 April 16 years prior to, and 1 April 14 years prior to the start of the tournament; third year junior high school, and first year high school students.
Youth A: Born between 2 April 18 years prior to, and 1 April 16 years prior to the start of the tournament; second and third year high school students.
Adults: Born before (and including) 1 April 18 years prior to the start of the tournament.
At one time there was a separate classification for teaching staff in addition to adults. In track and field, there remains an agreement which states that there much be at least one member of teaching staff, or the team's participation will be invalid.
Even now in preparation for the tournament, prefectures will increase recruitment of teaching staff, and reduce it after the event. Hiromi Taniguchi, once aiming for a career in teaching after graduation from university, was unable to take a position due to small vacancy numbers in the immediate aftermath of the Miyazaki event. Also, following the end of the teaching staff classification, an independent national sports tournament came into existence.
Up until the 59th tournament in 2004, adults could represent the prefecture in which they lived or worked. However, the following year marked the start of a "Hometown Athlete System" of registration (similar to the State of Origin concept in Australian sport).
This meant that participants could represent areas where they had graduated from junior high and high school. Thereafter there was an increase in the number of well known "hometown athletes", mainly focused around individual events.
From 2011 regulations were revised, to allow for participants who were based outside Japan to represent their home towns. Kosuke Kitajima, based at the time in Los Angeles where his coach lived, represented Tokyo in the 68th tournament in 2013.
In 2005 action was taken to include the participation of professional athletes under the "How to do it from now project". As a result, a selection of professional athletes have appeared at tournaments since then.
However, as a condition, in sports which are not governed by the Japan Professional Sports Association, judgment over participation is entrusted to each sports governing body.
As for athletes not holding Japanese citizenship, students enrolled in schools under article one of the School Education Law, may be eligible to participate (the decision is made by the governing body for the respective sport). From 2006, foreigners who have permanent residency became eligible to participate.

Tournament Logo 

The logo was created for the 2nd tournament in 1947. The logo is a red torch leaning at a 30-degree incline to the right, wrapped in a blue Obi.

Opening Ceremony 
Ever since the second tournament in 1947 the song , written by Takao Saeki and composed by Shinichi Takada, has been played at the opening and closing ceremonies of all large-scale sporting events. Furthermore, it is played at an opening ceremony in which the Emperor and Empress are both in attendance. At the Autumn tournament there is a torch relay following which a main torch is lit and burns until the closing ceremony. Previously there was also an opening ceremony at the Winter tournament, but in line with changes to the tournament from 2010 it was changed to a smaller and simpler starting ceremony.

The torch, which is based on the Olympic flame, was first introduced at the 5th tournament in 1950, and the torch relay at the 12th tournament in 1957. From the 3rd tournament in 1948 a relay event had been held, though this was to carry the tournament's official flag, though this only remained until the 27th tournament in 1972. Afterwards, only the torch relay took place.

Scoring and awards 
Points are awarded depending on the outcome of each individual event, with the sum of these points being the method of competing for the Emperor's and Empresses Cups. 10 points are given for participation in each game in the tournament (which includes block-tournaments). Points are not awarded for participation in a block-tournament if the entrant was eligible to participate in the main tournament. In the 64th tournament, the maximum number of participation points available was set at 400 points. The number of points awarded for victories differs depending on the event.

As well as the two main trophies, each event awards trophies and certificates to victorious athletes.

Criticism and Problems

Host Victory Principle 
Ever since the 1964 tournament in Niigata, the host team winning the Emperor's Cup and Empress's Cup has generally become the norm. This is not simply down to that team's preliminary scores, but by a number of factors including the ability to field athletes in every competition and the ability to strengthen athletes with the funding going into newly institutions such as venues and event management. In fact, Nobu Nishimura, the lieutenant governor of Yamaguchi prefecture which hosted the 2011 tournament, said at a party "the hosts have an advantage in events with flagmen (events where the result is decided by officials)" and "even if there's "cheating" they will take first place". When he was criticised, he explained his position by saying "I meant the tendency where host prefectures have an advantage, not that it's ok to break the rules".

In a move counter to this custom, as a result of then Kōchi prefecture governor, Daijirō Hashimoto, abolishing it at the 2002 Kochi hosted tournament, host prefecture Kōchi finished in 10th place with Tokyo winning overall. However, this is the only time such an occasion as occurred.

Large Scale Arena Constructions 
Recently many host prefectures have built large-scale venues in which to host various events, with a large focus on appearance. Examples include Nagai Stadium, Miyagi Stadium, Ōita Bank Dome, Tohoku Electric Power Big Swan Stadium, Shizuoka Stadium and International Stadium Yokohama. These were generally acknowledged as being built for the 2002 FIFA World Cup, but in reality their construction purpose was to be the main arena of the tournaments (however the International Stadium Yokohama was built with the intention of potentially hosting an Olympic games, and Nagai Stadium was renovated rather than built from scratch). The aforementioned arenas are also sometimes used as a base for J. League football teams based within the prefecture, but other arenas are not used very often following the tournament. In spite of no large-scale events being anticipated as taking place there following the tournament, large amounts of tax payer money continues to go toward its maintenance.

Tournament History

Predecessor 
Before the war, there was a tournament, called the Meiji Shrine Tournament, that was held from 1924 to 1943. It had no winter tournament and was held in each area of Kanto, as a general rule commencing in the outer garden of the Meiji Shrine (an area spanning what is now Shibuya and Shinjuku in Tokyo).

Formation 
On 26 December 1945 at the Kishi Memorial Gymnasium, Ryōzō Hiranuma (director of the Japan Sports Association), Izutarō Suehiro (chairman of the Japan Swimming Federation), Sanburō Kiyose, Tatsuo Hisatomi and Keijirō Ishida, who had all held important sporting administrative positions since before the war, proposed holding a national athletics event during talks about how sporting events could take place in the post war period.

In 1946, the group had informal talks with Hiromu Kasuga, the chairman of the Kansai Sports Federation, and formed a board of directors. After having their proposal examined and approval gained from GHQ, they received 400,000 yen from the government to help with costs, and the first tournament was held.

Tournament History 
Awarding the Emperor's Cup and Empress's Cup has depend on the prefecture. In the first, second, and the special tournament in 1973, neither were awarded. In the 6th, 7th and 8th tournaments, the winter tournament was split from the summer and autumn tournament. In the 9th tournament, it was divided further by separating the swimming tournament.

Any prefecture that was able to host the winter, summer and autumn tournaments have a ☆ mark at the start of their tournament names.

The tournament names are generally a reference to the autumn tournament. It is possible that the winter tournaments had a different name, especially if they were held elsewhere.

Tournaments in blue show where the host did not win the Emperor's Cup.

Commemorative Items 

With the exception of the first tournament, commemorative stamps have generally been issued for the autumn tournament. For the 2nd to 5th tournaments, 4 types of stamp were issued (only the third tournament had 5 types for the winter tournament as well). From the 6th to the 21st tournaments, there were two types of stamp issued, and ever since then there has been one type of stamp released for each tournament.

The regions railway company also issues commemorative items such as train tickets.

Mascot characters 
Each tournament normally has a unique mascot character to help build support and encourage good PR. The first mascot was a nameless goat for the 30th tournament (1975) in Mie prefecture, though it was referred to as pet-mark. In the 38th tournament, hosted in Gunma in 1983, the first named character, a horse called Gunma-chan, was used. From then on, having a named character became the norm. There were no characters between from the 31st to the 37th tournaments.

Recently, owing to the "Yuru-chara" boom, mascot characters commonly become official mascots of the prefecture in some capacity. There are many mascots who were already established as prefectural mascots prior to the tournament itself.

National Sports Festival of Japan Official Mascots (Wikipedia (ja):国民体育大会マスコットキャラクター)

Ceremonial Music 
At the opening and closing ceremonies the ceremonial music used is produced for each tournament, with it being performed when the torch and athletes enter the arena.

In addition to this, it is often the case where a singer with a strong local connection will sing, along with songs which match the theme of the tournament.

Television Broadcasts 
Generally there is a daily broadcast throughout the tournament from 3pm to 4pm on NHK Educational TV giving information about one or two events of that day. Also the opening ceremony is broadcast on NHK General TV.
On days in which there are competitive events rather than the opening and closing ceremonies, that prefecture's television studios and equipment are used (the newsroom, an open studio etc.). Also announcers from those stations (normally either a man and a woman, or just one person) take the host role, explaining events as the tournament progresses. The general broadcast format follows a simple flow. The outline summary of that day's main games, as well as introducing key athletes, a broadcast from the main sport venue of that day, a broadcast from the studio giving results of other events and other topics.

Events 
Events in bold have taken place since the first tournament.
Skiing
Giant slalom
Special jump
Cross-country skiing
Nordic combined
Mogul skiing (Open event)
Snowboarding (Open event)
Biathlon (Open event)
Skating
Speed skating
Short track speed skating
Figure skating
Ice hockey
Softball
Football
Track and field
Swimming
Swimming races
Diving
Synchronised swimming
Water polo
Tennis
Rowing
Field hockey
Boxing
Volleyball
Gymnastics
Basketball
Wrestling
Sailing
Weightlifting
Handball
Cycling
Soft tennis
Table tennis
Sumo wrestling
Equestrianism
Fencing
Judo
Badminton
Kyūdō
Rifle shooting
Kendo
Rugby
Mountaineering
Canoeing
Archery
Karate
Jūkendō
Clay pigeon shooting
Naginata
Bowling
Golf
High school baseball (Open event)
Beach volleyball (Open event)
Triathlon (Open event)

Previous events 
American football - First tournament only
Touch football - Second tournament only
Corporate baseball - First three tournaments only
Shinai Kyōgi

Exhibition Sporting Events 
There are normally around 20 exhibition events held at the Autumn tournament. The trend is to hold events that make the best use of local features.
Indiaca
Orienteering
Aerobics super session
Recreational dance
Houston safety blowgun
Recreational table tennis
Hang gliding・Paragliding
ESCI tennis
Soft volleyball
Target bird golf
Sports chanbara
Walking
Futsal
Sea kayak
Gateball
Wushu
Ground golf
Tug of war
Mini softball
Mini tennis
Folk dance
Duathlon
Kin-ball
Tee ball
Mini volleyball
Cayman golf
Mallet golf
Curolling
Dodgebee
Taspony
Cycling
Wakeboarding
Petanque
Billiards
Skateboarding
Roller sports
Bound tennis
Padel tennis
Beach football
Beachball volleyball
Surfing
Senior Softball
Neo-tennis
Powerlifting
Darts
BMX
Trampobics
Taidō
Spolec
Floorball
Radio calisthenics
Rhythmic gymnastics
3B gymnastics
Triathlon
5 km and 10 km Jogging marathons
Protected karate
Boys and Girls Sports
Dodgeball
Softball
Football
Handball
Disabled sports
Blind football
Powerchair football
Disabled softball
Disabled golf
Winter
Snowboarding
Freestyle skiing
Curling

Future tournaments 
From the 2013 tournament in Tokyo, softball, naginata, jūkendō and the triathlon will take place biannually.
There are debates underway regarding the implementation of women's events for sports in which there is a women's counterpart in the Olympics. Women's events have been added for Judo (since 1991) and Football (since 1997). There are plans for a 7-a-side women's rugby event, as well as a movement to change women's cycling and wrestling, which are currently exhibition events, into full tournament events.
Regarding youth sections, there have been motions to place upper limits on the number of participants, due to overcrowding.

Extras 
If a full-time company employee takes part in a tournament as a player, coach, referee, judge, official etc., they might qualify for special leave.
In the case of team sports, where it comes to team selections, it has been known for champion teams to go unchanged in subsequent tournaments. That is a matter for the sports governing body in each prefecture to determine.

See also 
Sport in Japan
List of sports governing bodies in Japan

References

External links 

Japan Sports Association
National Sports Festival

Multi-sport events in Japan
Japan
Recurring sporting events established in 1946
Sports festivals in Japan
1946 establishments in Japan